Charles Reis Felix (April 29, 1923 – January 25, 2017) was an American writer who was a prominent contributor to Luso-American literature.

Biography
Charles Reis Felix was born in New Bedford, Massachusetts, one of four children of Portuguese immigrant parents. Felix's name on his birth certificate was the Portuguese "Carlos," but as a child he was referred to as "Charley." Felix grew up during the lean years of the Great Depression and graduated from New Bedford High School in 1941. He studied at the University of Michigan from 1941–43, until he was drafted into the U.S. Army.

After the war, Felix continued his undergraduate education, receiving a B.A. in History from Stanford University in Palo Alto, California. He became an elementary-school teacher and spent 31 years in the classroom, while returning to Massachusetts for family visits on occasion.

Writings
Felix's work interweaves autobiography, historical narrative and fiction to depict the human experience.  Felix's first book, Crossing the Sauer, was an account of his three months as a combat infantryman from January through March 1945. Crossing the Sauer was hailed by Paul Fussell as "one of the most honest, unforgettable memoirs of the war I've read."

His second book, 2004's Through a Portagee  Gate, depicts his upbringing in New Bedford, and describes a relationship between the author and his father, Jose or "Joe" Felix, that resonates with many individuals of Portuguese ancestry in the United States.  In fact, the University of Massachusetts Dartmouth presented a theatrical play version of Felix's book on his birthday in 2006, much to the delight of the author.

Felix's third book, Da Gama, Cary Grant, and the Election of 1934, dealt with local politics amid the ethnic enclaves of New Bedford, Massachusetts.  In the book, Felix describes the candidacy of a Portuguese-American for local office, and his attempts to unseat the "All-American," Yankee incumbent. His last published book was Tony: A New England Boyhood.

The manuscripts and personal papers of Charles Reis Felix are held by The Ferreira-Mendes Portuguese American Archives, University of Massachusetts Dartmouth.

Personal
Felix lived with his wife Barbara in a cabin among the redwoods of Northern California. They had two children. He died in January 2017 at the age of 93.

Books
Crossing the Sauer: A memoir of World War II (2002)
Through a Portagee Gate (2004)
Da Gama, Cary Grant, and the Election of 1934 (2005)
Tony: A New England Boyhood (2008)

Translations
Vasco da Gama, Cary Grant e as Eleições de 1934. Translation of Da Gama, Cary Grant, and the Election of 1934.  Edited by Rui Zink and translated by Emília Madureira and Rui Zink.  EDEL Editora (2011)

References

Monteiro, George (2006). "Fiction: Portugal and the United States". In Iberia and the Americas: culture, politics, and history: a multidisciplinary encyclopedia.  ABC-CLIO Inc.
Mendonça, Duarte (2006).  "Um emergente escritor luso-americano".  Revista Diário, July 16–22, pp. 12–7
Silva, Reinaldo (2008).  Representations of the Portuguese in American Literature.  Center for Portuguese Studies and Culture, University of Massachusetts Dartmouth
Alves, Maria Teresa Gomes Ferreira de Almeida (2009) "Between Worlds: A Convergence of Kindred Lives". DEA-FLUL/Edições Colibri, pp. 755–64
Azevedo, Rui Vitorino (2010) "Not Quite White: the Ethno-Racial Identity of a Portagee". Uma Revista de Estudos Anglo-Americanos / A Journal of Anglo-American Studies, 12, pp. 19–34
Fagundes, Francisco Cota (2010-2011). "Of Portuguese Ethnicity in Gaw: Felix's Da Gama, Cary Grant, and the Election of 1934 as Composite Novel".  Gávea-Brown, A Bilingual Journal of Portuguese-American Letters and Studies, XXXII-XXXIII, pp. 5–35
Felix, Charles Reis (2011).  "The Americans" from Through a Portagee Gate.  In the anthology: Luso-American Literature: Writings by Portuguese-Speaking Authors in North America.  Rutgers University. Press, pp. 128–35
Fagundes, Francisco Cota (2011).  "I Write Nonfiction Fiction': An Interview with Charles Reis Felix".  In Narrating the Portuguese Diaspora: Piecing Things Together. Peter Lang

External links

Official Website of Charles Reis Felix
Distinguished Americans & Canadians of Portuguese Descent

1923 births
2017 deaths
American educators
American male non-fiction writers
American memoirists
United States Army personnel of World War II
American people of Portuguese descent
People from New Bedford, Massachusetts
Stanford University alumni
University of Michigan alumni
United States Army soldiers